Kim Ah-young (born November 6, 1992), better known by her stage name Yura, is a South Korean singer and actress. She is best known as a member of the South Korean girl group Girl's Day. She has since ventured into acting and has starred in television series Radio Romance (2018),  Now, We Are Breaking Up (2021–2022), and Forecasting Love and Weather (2022).

Early life and education 
Yura was born on November 6, 1992, in Ulsan, South Korea. She attended Ulsan Art High School as a dance major. Yura is currently attending Dongduk Women's University, alongside fellow group member Minah.

Career

2010: Girl's Day
In 2010, Yura became a member of the K-pop girl group Girl's Day, where she and Lee Hye-ri replaced two of the former members, Ji-in and Ji-sun, who left after having been with the group for two months. Dream Tea promoted Girl's Day before their debut with the creation of an official Fan Café, a YouTube channel, and Twitter accounts for the group and each of its members. The group also conducted a flash mob dance before the debut in the commercial and entertainment districts of Seoul, attracting much interest.

2012–2014: Acting debut and collaborations
In 2012, Yura made her acting debut through Sohu TV's Chinese drama Secret Angel. She then collaborated with her label-mate Jevice with their single "I'll Love You". Yura also featured in SBS's series To the Beautiful You.

In 2013, Yura was cast in the sitcom Reckless Family 3. She also featured in a special episode of KBS' night show The Clinic for Married Couples: Love and War 2.

In 2014, Yura starred in the SBS mini drama Be Arrogant. She then became one of the official couples for the variety show We Got Married, where she was paired with model-actor Hong Jong-hyun.

2016–present: MC and acting
In 2015, Yura co-hosted the fourth season of reality competition series K-pop Star alongside Jun Hyun-moo. Additionally, Yura also serves as the MC for joint Korean-Chinese audition program Super Idol.

In 2016, Yura was cast as one of the new MCs of Olive Channel's Tasty Road with Kim Min-jung. The same year, she joined tvN's variety show After the Play Ends and acted in the web drama Iron Lady.

In 2017, Yura was cast as one of the new MCs of tvN's Life Bar with Kim Hee-chul, joining original MCs Shin Dong-yup and Kim Jun-hyun. She was also chosen as one of the MCs for KBS Drama's Beauty Bible 2017, alongside Han Hye-jin  and Im Soo-hyang. The same year, she starred in JTBC's short drama Hip Hop Teacher.

In 2018, Yura starred in KBS' romance drama Radio Romance.

In December 2021, Yura made her debut as the author of the poetry collection of Journeys in Different Seasons with Na Tae-joo.

In February 2022, Yura decided to extend her contract with Awesome Ent.

Personal life

Lawsuit
On November 8, 2010, Yura's ex-management company Action Music Entertainment filed an injunction against Yura, stopping her from signing a second contract with Dream T Entertainment. In response, representatives of Dream T stated Action Music had violated contractual terms. The lawsuit was pursued when Action Music insisted that they had a video of Yura's unacceptable behavior. On January 20, 2011, the court ruled in Yura's favor.

Discography

Singles

As featured artist

Filmography

Film

Television series

Television show

Web shows

Radio shows

Hosting

Music video appearances

Awards and nominations

References

External links

  
 
 
 

1992 births
Living people
K-pop singers
South Korean female idols
21st-century South Korean actresses
South Korean women pop singers
People from Ulsan
South Korean television personalities
South Korean dance musicians
South Korean television actresses
Girl's Day members
Dongduk Women's University alumni